The Fifth Deuba cabinet was the Government of Nepal from 13 July 2021 to 26 December 2022. It was formed after Sher Bahadur Deuba was appointed as the new prime minister of Nepal by president Bidya Devi Bhandari following an order from the Supreme Court, which declared the dissolution of the House of Representatives on the recommendation of former prime minister KP Sharma Oli to be unlawful. The fifth Deuba cabinet was replaced by the third Dahal cabinet on 26 December 2022, when Pushpa Kamal Dahal's CPN (Maoist Centre) broke away from the electoral alliance with Nepali Congress and joined hands with other opposition parties to form a government in the aftermath of the 2022 general election.

The cabinet consisted of an alliance of political parties formed in opposition of former prime minister Oli's dissolution of the House of Representatives. It consisted of Nepali Congress, the CPN (Maoist Centre), CPN (Unified Socialist) and People's Socialist Party, Nepal during formation. The Loktantrik Samajbadi Party, Nepal and Rastriya Janamorcha provides confidence and support to the government.

History

Formation 
On 12 July 2021, the constitutional bench of the Supreme Court ruled that the President's decision to dissolve the House of Representatives on the recommendation of the Council of Ministers was unlawful and ordered the appointment of Deuba as prime minister within 28 hours. President Bhandari appointed Deuba as the Prime Minister in accordance with Article 76 (5) of the Constitution of Nepal, and he was sworn in for a fifth term on 13 July 2021.

Four ministers took their oath of office alongside Deuba. The full cabinet was formed on 8 October 2021.

Vote of confidence 
On 18 July 2021, Minister for Law, Justice and Parliamentary Affairs, Gyanendra Bahadur Karki, registered a proposal for vote of confidence in the first meeting of reinstated House of Representatives. Out of 249 lawmakers present in the meeting, Deuba received support of 165 lawmakers with 83 against while one abstained. Deuba received votes from the CPN (Maoist Centre), the People's Socialist Party, Nepal and a faction of the CPN (UML). The PSPN, collectively voted for Deuba despite internal split within the party.

Reactions 

: The ambassador of the United States to Nepal, Randy Berry, was the first diplomat to congratulate Deuba, visiting Deuba at his residence with congratulatory messages on 14 July. Earlier, he had congratulated Deuba, within an hour of his appointment, via a tweet.

: The Indian ambassador to Nepal, Vinay Mohan Kwatra, visited Deuba at his residence on 14 July to congratulate him on his appointment. The Indian prime minister, Narendra Modi, congratulated Deuba via a tweet on 18 July, after Deuba had won the vote of confidence.  The two prime ministers had a telephonic conversation on 19 July, where they vowed to "work together to further enhance the wide-ranging cooperation between India and Nepal, including in the fight against the COVID-19 pandemic."

: The Israeli ambassador to Nepal, Hanan Goder-Goldberger, visited Deuba at Singha Durbar on 15 July, stating he was "hopeful of Nepal–Israel relations to get stronger" during Deuba's tenure.

: The Chinese ambassador to Nepal, Hou Yanqui, visited Deuba at Singha Durbar on 20 July, where she announced the grant of an additional 16 lakh doses of the COVID-19 vaccines to Nepal.

Apart from these, Deuba received congratulatory remarks from the heads of government and diplomats of other countries.

Division of ministries among coalition parties and cabinet expansion 
Intra-party matters of the four parties in the governing coalition delayed the allotment of ministries and resulted in the fulfillment of the cabinet 85 days after the prime minister taking office. Being the largest party in the coalition, Nepali Congress was apportioned eight ministries and one state minister, excluding the prime minister. CPN (Maoist Centre) was apportioned five ministries and one state minister, while CPN (Unified Socialist) and People's Socialist Party, Nepal were apportioned four ministries each, with the former also given one state minister.

NC  – Office of the Prime Minister and Council of Ministers, Ministry of Home Affairs, Ministry of Defence, Ministry of Foreign Affairs, Ministry of Law, Justice and Parliamentary Affairs, Ministry of Industry, Commerce and Supplies, Ministry of Information and Communication, Ministry of Women, Children and Senior Citizens and Ministry of Water Supply

CPN (MC)  – Ministry of Finance, Ministry of Energy, Water Resource and Irrigation, Ministry of Education, Ministry of Land Management, Cooperative and Poverty Allivation, Ministry of Youth and Sports

CPN (US)  – Ministry of Culture, Tourism and Civil Aviation, Ministry of Health and Population, Ministry of Labour, Employment and Social Security, Ministry of Urban Development

PSP-N  – Ministry of Physical Infrastructure and Transportation, Ministry of Agriculture and Livestock, Ministry of Forest and Environment, Ministry of Federal Affairs and General Administration

Dissolution 
On 25 December 2022, the final day of negotiations to form a new government in the aftermath of the 2022 election, the ruling alliance which contested the election together failed to gather a consensus on who would lead the upcoming government, with both Deuba and Pushpa Kamal Dahal laying claim on the position of prime minister. After all negotiations failed, Dahal broke away from the electoral alliance and approached the CPN (UML), which supported his nomination for prime minister, alongside the Rastriya Swatantra Party, Rastriya Prajatantra Party, Janamat Party, PSPN and other independents. President Bhandari appointed Dahal the next prime minister the same day, and he was sworn in for a third term the day after.

Final arrangement

Former arrangement

Till 6 July 2022

Till 27 June 2022

Till 7 April 2022

Till 16 December 2021

See also  
 Deuba cabinet, 2017

Notes

References

Cabinet of Nepal
2021 establishments in Nepal
Cabinets established in 2021
Deuba